Chen Xu (born February 1962) is a Chinese diplomat who is the current , in office since 2019. He previously served as director of the Department of European Affairs of the Ministry of Foreign Affairs of the People's Republic of China and before that, Chinese Ambassador to the Netherlands.

Biography
Born in Yanggu County, Shandong, in February 1962, Chen graduated from Fudan University and China Foreign Affairs University.

Chen worked in the International Department of the Ministry of Foreign Affairs of the People's Republic of China after university in 1985. He was recalled to the original International Department in 1992.

Chen returned to China in 2003 and that same year became deputy director of the Foreign Affairs Office of the People's Government of Xinjiang Uygur Autonomous Region. In 2004, he became deputy director of the International Department of the Ministry of Foreign Affairs, rising to director in 2010. 

He was designated by President Xi Jinping in 2013 to replace Zhang Jun as Chinese Ambassador to the Netherlands.  

He was director of the Department of European Affairs of the Ministry of Foreign Affairs in May 2016, and held that office until 2019.

In 2019, he was appointed , succeeding Yu Jianhua.

References

1962 births
Living people
People from Yanggu County, Shandong
Fudan University alumni
China Foreign Affairs University alumni
Ambassadors of China to the Netherlands
Diplomats of the People's Republic of China